Victor Vincent Veysey (April 14, 1915 – February 13, 2001) was an American Republican politician who represented California in the United States House of Representatives for two terms from 1971 to 1975. From 1975 to 1977, he served as Assistant Secretary of the Army under President Gerald Ford.

Education
Born in 1915 in Los Angeles, California, Veysey grew up in Brawley and Eagle Rock, graduating from Eagle Rock High School. He received a BS in civil engineering from Caltech in 1936 and an MBA from Harvard University in 1938. He also did graduate work at Stanford University.

Career
Veysey was a professor at Caltech from 1938 to 1940 and from 1941 to 1946, and at Stanford University from 1940 to 1941.

He subsequently moved to the Imperial Valley where he farmed.

He became a member of the Brawley School Board in 1955, a member of the Imperial Valley College Board in 1960 and a member of the U.S. Department of Agriculture Advisory Commission in 1959.

In 1962 Veysey was elected to the California State Assembly for the 75th district serving from 1963 to 1971. In 1970 he was elected to congress and reelected in 1972. He was a delegate to the 1972 Republican National Convention. In the Watergate year of 1974, he was narrowly defeated by Democratic West Covina Mayor James F. Lloyd.

Between 1975 and 1977 he was Assistant Secretary for Civil Works for the U.S. Army.

In 1983, he was Secretary for Industrial Relations for the State of California.

Death
Veysey died in 2001 while living in Hemet and is buried at Riverview Cemetery, in Brawley.

References

External links

1915 births
2001 deaths
California Institute of Technology alumni
California Institute of Technology faculty
Harvard Business School alumni
Republican Party members of the California State Assembly
School board members in California
People from Hemet, California
Politicians from Los Angeles
Stanford University alumni
Stanford University faculty
Ford administration personnel
Republican Party members of the United States House of Representatives from California
20th-century American politicians
People from Brawley, California
United States Navy personnel of World War II